The Dutch Boy 150 is an ARCA Menards Series race held at Kansas Speedway. It is one of two races the series has at the track, the other being the Reese's 150 in September. The race was added to the schedule in 2020 after the cancellation of the race at Chicagoland Speedway due to COVID-19 regulations in Illinois. It then became a permanent race on the ARCA Menards Series schedule in 2021.

Past winners

References

External links
 

2020 establishments in Kansas
ARCA Menards Series
Motorsport in Kansas
ARCA Menards Series races
NASCAR races at Kansas Speedway
Sports in the Kansas City metropolitan area